The Taça Guanabara, or Guanabara Cup, is a football tournament organized annually since 1965 by the Rio de Janeiro State Football Federation. In its first four editions (1965, 1966, 1967 and 1968), the Taça Guanabara was a tournament in its own right, unrelated to the Rio de Janeiro league, and the winner would represent Rio de Janeiro in the Taça Brasil de Futebol national league competition.  From 1969 onward, the cup became the first round of the Rio de Janeiro state league.

Since 1982, the winners of the Taça Guanabara would play the winners of the Taça Rio in the Rio de Janeiro state championship final, with the exceptions of 1994 and 1995.

The most successful team in the tournament's history is Flamengo, who have won 23 times.

Current format
Sixteen teams qualified from the state of Rio de Janeiro are divided into two groups of eight teams. The traditional "Big Four" teams in the state, Botafogo, Flamengo, Fluminense and Vasco da Gama, are seeded. Two of the four are placed in each group.

Each team plays seven matches in the group stage: once against every of team of their group. The two highest placed teams in each group qualify to the semifinals. The top team in each group plays the second placed team from the other group in the semifinal in a single match, and the winners compete in the final of the tournament. The champion of the tournament qualified for the Campeonato Carioca Finals to play against the winner of the Taça Rio.

History
The first season of the tournament was held in 1965. At the time, the tournament was considered a separate competition unrelated to the Campeonato Carioca. In its first years, its purpose was to define the Guanabara representative in the Taça Brasil, but it kept being played even after the Taça Brasil's last edition. In 1971, the tournament became the first stage of Campeonato Carioca but is still considered a separate competition to a certain extent, with a trophy awarded to the winner of the tournament.

The current format has been used throughout the tournament's history with the exception of the 1994 and 1995 editions.

In 1994, twelve teams were divided into two groups (similar to the current format). However, in the group stage, teams not only played against teams from their same group, but also played against the teams from the other group in the second phase of the group stage (similar to the Taça Rio format). After the group stage, the first placed team in each group faced each other in the Taça Guanabara final. Semi-finals were not played. The Taça Guanabara final results had no bearing on the Campeonato Carioca. The two highest placed teams of each Taça Guanabara group entered the final phase of Campeonato Carioca. Those four teams played a double round-robin tournament to contest the Campeonato Carioca championship.

In 1995, the number of teams increased to 16 while the format remained similar to 1994: two groups of 8 teams contested two group stage phases. After the group stage, the top team of each group competed in the Taça Guanabara final, with the winner being awarded one point in the final phase of Campeonato Carioca. The first placed team in each group after the first and second phase of the group stage also received one extra point for a total of five "bonus" points contributed towards teams in the Campeonato Carioca. The top four teams in each group then contested the final phase of Campeonato Carioca in a double round-robin tournament to determine the winner of Campeonato Carioca. Because of these format changes, the Taça Rio was not held in these three years. Since 1996, the old format has been adopted again.

The most recent Taça Guanabara champion was Vasco da Gama in 2019.

Finalists

Titles by team
 Flamengo 23 titles
 Vasco da Gama 13 titles
 Fluminense 12 titles
 Botafogo 8 titles
 América 1 title
 Americano 1 title
 Volta Redonda 1 title

Broadcasting rights

Brazil

Statistics
Since 1990, the winner of the Taça Guanabara has also won the State championship in 1992, 1994, 1997, 1998, 1999, 2001, 2003, 2004, 2006, 2007, 2008, 2010, 2011, 2012 and 2013.

Flamengo in 1996 and 2011, Vasco da Gama in 1992 and 1998, and Botafogo in 2010 and 2013 have won both rounds of the Rio de Janeiro State championship.

See also
Campeonato Carioca
Taça Rio

References

Campeonato Carioca
Football cup competitions in Rio de Janeiro (state)